The Super Bowl Most Valuable Player Award, or Super Bowl MVP, is presented annually to the most valuable player of the Super Bowl, the National Football League's (NFL) championship game. The winner is chosen by a panel of 16 football writers and broadcasters, and, since Super Bowl XXXV in 2001, fans voting electronically. The media panel's ballots count for 80 percent of the vote tally, while the viewers' ballots make up the other 20 percent. The game's viewing audience can vote on the Internet or by using cellular phones; Media voters are asked to vote with about five minutes remaining in the game, but are allowed to change their mind when the game ends. They can nominate one player from each team, with instructions to count their vote for the player on the winning team. Voters cannot select an entire unit.

The Super Bowl MVP has been awarded annually since the game's inception in 1967. Through 1989, the award was presented by SPORT magazine. Bart Starr was the MVP of the first two Super Bowls. Since 1990, the award has been presented by the NFL. At Super Bowl XXV, the league first awarded the Pete Rozelle Trophy, named after former NFL commissioner Pete Rozelle, to the Super Bowl MVP. Ottis Anderson was the first to win the trophy. The most recent Super Bowl MVP, from Super Bowl LVII held on February 12, 2023, is Kansas City Chiefs quarterback Patrick Mahomes.

Tom Brady is the only player to have won five Super Bowl MVP awards (four with the New England Patriots and one with the Tampa Bay Buccaneers); Joe Montana won three and four  other players—Bart Starr, Terry Bradshaw, Eli Manning, and Patrick Mahomes—have won the award twice. Starr and Bradshaw are the only ones to have won it in back-to-back years. The MVP has come from the winning team every year except 1971, when Dallas Cowboys linebacker Chuck Howley won the award despite the Cowboys' loss in Super Bowl V to the Baltimore Colts. Harvey Martin and Randy White were named co-MVPs of Super Bowl XII, the only time co-MVPs have been chosen. Including the Super Bowl XII co-MVPs, seven Cowboys players have won Super Bowl MVP awards, the most of any NFL team. Quarterbacks have earned the honor 32 times in 57 games (and 58 awards).

From Super Bowl I to Super Bowl XLIX the Super Bowl MVP won a new car from General Motors as a part of their MVP award. However since Hyundai became the offical vehicle partner of the NFL from the 2015 NFL season onward no new car has been awarded to the Super Bowl MVP since Super Bowl 50.

Winners

By team

By position

Multiple winners

See also
 List of Super Bowl starting quarterbacks
 List of Super Bowl champions
 List of Super Bowl head coaches
 List of Super Bowl officials
 List of National Football League awards

Notes

References

General

Specific

Awards established in 1967
Most valuable player awards
Most Valuable Player Award
 
Most Valuable Player Award